Horaiclavidae  is a family of predatory sea snails, marine gastropod mollusks in the superfamily Conoidea.

In 2011 this family was split off from the family Pseudomelatomidae (formerly the subfamily Crassispirinae McLean, 1971) by Bouchet P., Kantor Yu.I., Sysoev A. & Puillandre N. in their publication "A new operational classification of the Conoidea". It forms a clade together with the family Clavatulidae. It has many characters in common with the family Pseudomelatomidae, except the smaller shell with a low spire, the short siphonal canal and a weak or absent spiral sculpture.  The radular formula is 1-0-0-0-1, but some species in this family lack a radula.

Genera 
Genera within the family Horaiclavidae include:
 Anacithara Hedley, 1922
 Anguloclavus Shuto, 1983
 Aoteadrillia Powell, 1942
 Asperosculptura Ardovini, Poppe & Tagaro, 2021
 Austrocarina Laseron, 1954
 Austrodrillia Hedley, 1918
 Buchema Corea, 1934
 Carinapex Dall, 1924
 Ceritoturris Dall, 1924
 Coronacomitas Shuto, 1983
 Cytharoclavus Kuroda & Oyama in Kuroda, Habe & Oyama, 1971
 Darrylia García, 2008
 Epideira Hedley, 1918
 Graciliclava Shuto, 1983
 Haedropleura Bucquoy, Dautzenberg & Dollfus, 1883
 Horaiclavus Oyama, 1954 - type genus
 Inodrillia Bartsch, 1943 - synonyms: Inodrillara Bartsch, 1943; Inodrillina Bartsch, 1943
 Inkinga Kilburn, 1988
 Iwaoa Kuroda, 1940
 Marshallena Allan, 1927 - synonym: Sugitanitoma Kuroda, 1959
 Mauidrillia Powell, 1942
 Micropleurotoma Thiele, 1929
 Naskia Sysoev & Ivanov, 1985
 Nquma Kilburn, 1988
 Paradrillia Makiyama, 1940 - synonyms: Vexitomina Powell, 1942; Alticlavatula MacNeil, 1960
 Pseudexomilus Powell, 1944
 Psittacodrillia Kilburn, 1988
 Striatoguraleus Kilburn, 1994
 Vexitomina Powell, 1942
Genera brought into synonymy
 Alticlavatula MacNeil, 1961: synonym of Paradrillia Makiyama, 1940
 Inodrillara Bartsch, 1943: synonym of Inodrillia Bartsch, 1943
 Inodrillina Bartsch, 1943: synonym of Inodrillia Bartsch, 1943
 Regidrillia Powell, 1942: synonym of Austrodrillia Hedley, 1918
 Sugitanitoma Kuroda, 1959: synonym of Marshallena Finlay, 1926

References 

 Sysoev, A. V., and D. L. Ivanov. "Nex Taxa of the Family Turridae (Gastropoda, Toxoglossa) from the Naska-ridge (Southeast Pacific)." Zoologichesky Zhurnal 64.2 (1985): 194–205.

External links 
  Bonfitto, Antonio, and Mauro Morassi. "Two new Horaiclavus (Horaiclavidae, Conoidea) species from the Indo-Pacific region." Zootaxa 3821.1 (2014): 146-150
  Tucker, J.K. 2004 Catalog of recent and fossil turrids (Mollusca: Gastropoda). Zootaxa 682:1-1295.
 Sealifebase: Species mentioned in Tucker, J.K. 2004 Catalog of recent and fossil turrids (Mollusca: Gastropoda). Zootaxa 682:1-1295
 Worldwide Species Data Base: Horaiclavidae